David Brickner (born September 29, 1958) is an American ordained Baptist minister who has been head of the Messianic Jewish missionary group Jews for Jesus since 1996.

Background and family 
Brickner was born in Beverly, Massachusetts. Brickner describes himself as a fifth-generation Jewish believer in Jesus. His mother was raised as a Jewish Christian, the descendant of a Hasidic rabbi in Russia, and his father was raised as a traditional Jew. He has two children, Isaac and Ilana.

Education
 1981 Graduated Moody Bible Institute, Chicago, IL. Diploma in Jewish and Modern Israel Studies
 1986 Northeastern Illinois University in conjunction with Spertus Institute for Jewish Learning and Leadership. B.A. in Judaica, Minor in Music
 1994 Fuller School of World Mission, Pasadena, CA. M.A. in Missiology, Concentration in Jewish Evangelism/Judaic Studies

Career
Brickner began his career as a missionary with the Chicago branch of Jews for Jesus.  He led the New York City branch until May 1996, then was elected by a council of his peers as the organization's second executive director. Brickner has been in ministry for over thirty years and has appeared many times on secular television and radio programs.

Controversial statements
On August 12, 2002, representatives of the U.S. Conference of Catholic Bishops and the National Council of Synagogues signed a joint statement that Catholics should no longer try to evangelize Jews because they "already dwell in a saving covenant with God." Evangelical groups, including Jews for Jesus, strongly objected to the statement. A Los Angeles Times article reported that "the controversy has touched a nerve that underlies religious relations." The article went on to say, "And the ever-controversial Jews for Jesus movement, which believes that Jesus is the Messiah that Jews have been waiting for, also stepped in. David Brickner, the group's executive director, said the bishops had 'crossed the line' and betrayed their responsibility to spread the Gospel. 'Jews need to hear the Gospel. Period. Excluding my Jewish people from Christian witness is theologically and biblically untenable, yet this is exactly what American Catholic bishops' did, Brickner said."

Brickner was reported to have said on 17 August 2008 that the deaths in the Jerusalem bulldozer attack were God's "judgment" for Jews having failed to convert to Christianity. The comments created further controversy because they were made at the Wasilla Bible Church, where Sarah Palin is a member; Palin was chosen a week later to be the Republican candidate for vice-president in the 2008 United States presidential election. Political analysts speculated that Brickner's remarks would cause the Republicans to lose Jewish voters. In an interview with NBC news David Brickner responded to this assessment of his guest speech by saying "That's not what I was saying ... That's not what I believe. The violence is evidence that sin has marred our human condition and because of sin and non belief, God's judgment rests on all humanity."

Books
 Mishpochah Matters: The Jewish Way to Say Family : Speaking Frankly to God's Family, 1996
 Future Hope, 1999
 Christ in the Feast of Tabernacles, 2006
 Christ in the Feast of Pentecost, 2008

Musical albums produced
 Times and Seasons 1986
 Music for Messiah Live 1989
 Messianic Music Festival 1991
 Yeladim for Y'shua 1991
 He Will Return 1991
 Psalms of a Modern David 1991
 David's Hope 1997

References

1958 births
Living people
American religious writers
Moody Bible Institute alumni
Northeastern Illinois University alumni
People from Beverly, Massachusetts
Jews for Jesus
Messianic clergy